Francesco Depasquale (born June 1970) is a Maltese judge. In December 2022, Depasquale was chosen to serve as president of the European Commission for the Efficiency of Justice (CEPEJ) for a period of two years. He formerly served as vice president of the CEPEJ, and initially joined the body in 2007 as a representative from Malta on the commission.

See also 

 Judiciary of Malta

References

External links
https://offshoreleaks.icij.org/nodes/56046686

Living people
20th-century Maltese lawyers
21st-century Maltese judges
1970 births
People from Attard